The Scottish Youth Cup (also known as the SFA Youth Cup) is an annual Scottish football competition run by the Scottish Football Association for under-18 teams,
previously under-19 teams. The competition started in 1983–84 and is open to all clubs in full membership of SFA.

The competition's first winners, Celtic, have won the competition 15 times, more than any other club. Rangers are the current holders, having defeated Hearts in the final of the 2021–22 competition.

The final of the 2019–20 season and the whole of the 2020–21 competition was not held due to COVID-19 pandemic.

Finals

Key

Results

Performance by club

Cup final managers

Notable players 
Below is a list of Scottish Youth Cup finalists who went on to gain full internationals honours. The years in brackets are the years, in which that player appeared in the Scottish Youth Cup final. The years in bold are the years, in which that player won the trophy.

 Ian Durrant (1984)
 Derek Whyte (1984)
 Peter Grant (1984)
 Robert Fleck (1984)
 Joe Miller (1985)
 Christian Dailly (1991)
 Lee Wilkie
 Barry Ferguson
 Craig Moore
 Charlie Miller
 Paul Ritchie (1993)
 Robbie Neilson (1998)
 Scott Severin (1998)
 Mark Burchill (1999)
 Stephen Hughes (2000)
 Craig Gordon (2000)
 Kevin McNaughton (2001)
 Shaun Maloney (2001)
 Craig Beattie (2001)
 Stephen McManus (2001)
 John Kennedy (2001)
 Charlie Adam (2002)
 Chris Burke (2002)
 Alan Hutton (2002)

 Aiden McGeady (2003)
 Craig Beattie (2003)
 David Marshall (2003)
 Ross Wallace (2003)
 Charlie Mulgrew (2003, 2005)
 Michael McGovern (2003)
 Steven Naismith (2004)
 Kjartan Finnbogason (2005)
 Michael McGlinchey (2005, 2006)
 Teddy Bjarnason (2005, 2006)
 Paul Caddis (2006, 2007)
 Darren O'Dea (2006)
 Lee Wallace (2006)
 Andrew Shinnie (2007, 2008)

 Dean Furman (2007)
 Cillian Sheridan (2007, 2008)
 Daniel Lafferty (2007, 2008)
 Andrew Little (2008)
 Georgios Efrem (2008)
 Thomas Kind Bendiksen (2008)
 David Wotherspoon (2009)
 Danny Wilson (2009)

 James Forrest (2010)
 Dylan McGeouch (2010, 2012)
 Stephen O'Donnell (2011)
 Callum McGregor (2010, 2011, 2012, 2013)
 Jackson Irvine (2011, 2012, 2013) 
 Barrie McKay (2014)
 Callum Paterson (2014)
 Kieran Tierney (2015)
 Fraser Aird (2015)
 Chris Cadden (2016)
 David Turnbull (2016)
 Billy Gilmour (2017)
 Conor Hazard (2017)
 Nathan Patterson (2019)

References

External links
Official site

 
5
Youth football competitions
Youth football in Scotland